Jesper Swedberg (28 August 1653 (O.S)–26 July 1735 (N.S)) was a bishop of Skara, Sweden. He was one of Sweden's most notable churchmen. He published the first edition ever of a Swedish book of hymns in 1694, and was the father of scientist and mystic Emanuel Swedenborg.

Early life 
Jesper Swedberg was born as the son of a bergsman (owner of a farm privileged with mining rights) and his wife, daughter of a pastor, in Falun Municipality. His family were devoted Christians. After basic school, he began studying theology at the University of Lund in 1669, with the intention of becoming a minister. In 1674 he went north to the University of Uppsala, where he further educated himself until he became a priest.

In 1683 he got married, and during the next two years he travelled through Europe. In Sweden, he had learnt much theory, but in Europe he saw many practical approaches towards the Christian faith. Among them were the traditions of the Catholic Church in France, and the Pietist movement in Hamburg, Germany.

When he got back to Stockholm he gave sermons in Stockholm, influenced by what he had seen in Europe. His outspokenness and honesty impressed the Swedish King Charles XI, who made him court chaplain.

Working for the Church and Crown 
In 1686 Swedberg was entrusted with the task of creating a Book of Hymns, and in 1692 he was trusted as the person in charge of a new Swedish Bible translation as well. The first edition ever of a Swedish book of hymns was printed in 1694. This is today known as Swedberg's Book of Hymns. As it happens, very shortly after the publication, some influential people decided the book was heretical, claiming it focused too much on good deeds and not enough on faith. The whole edition was revoked. Some copies were however sent to Swedish colonies overseas, such as to New Sweden, Delaware.

In 1695 a new edition was published. Of the circa 500 hymns, 30 bore Swedberg's name, either as the author or as the translator. Several of these are still in the modern Swedish Book of Hymns.

While doing this work, he lived in Stockholm, the capital of Sweden. This was also the birthplace of most of his children, of whom the most famous today is Emanuel Swedenborg, who was born in 1688 as the second son.
 
The Bible translation turned out to be a futile labour, as churchmen said they did not have time to check the translation, claiming sarcastically that they were too busy looking over a certain Book of Hymns. It was decided to print an older translation instead, which was done in 1703. This edition, known as Charles XII's Bible, is still renowned in Sweden today.

After having finished this tedious work, Swedberg was appointed professor of theology at the University of Uppsala in 1695. Shortly thereafter, in 1702, he was also appointed bishop of Skara.

Professor and bishop 
As a bishop, Swedberg took a special interest in the lost souls over in Delaware, and appointed several priests to go and live there, and he wrote letters and sermons to them.

As Swedberg was writing so much, he began to take a special interest in the Swedish language. At the end of the 17th century, he made several contributions to the ongoing debate about the Swedish language. Swedberg advocated that the orthodox Swedish grammar was to be preserved as much as possible, and was patriotic concerning the language which he believed had an ancient history. But once again, his views were largely disregarded by the establishment. He nonetheless manifested his ideas in a combined book of grammar and dictionary, published in 1716.

In 1719 he and his children were ennobled by Queen Ulrika Eleonora of Sweden, for his services.

In those days the wooden buildings of cities were subject to disastrous fires, and Uppsala was no exception. In Uppsala, Swedberg's house burned down three times: in 1702, 1716 and 1730. These calamities had a negative impact on his health, especially as he was getting old, but he nevertheless wrote his memoirs, which were filled with gratitude towards the Lord, to whom Swedberg attributed all good things in his life.

Beliefs 
What has made Swedberg stand out is that he so harshly criticized the established Lutheran Church in Sweden. He himself had grown up in the countryside, unlike many priests who had learnt about the Lutheran doctrines already from their fathers. Swedberg was saying that the modern beliefs had too much brain and not enough heart to them.

It is said that Swedberg throughout his life retained a naive form of Christianity from his childhood. Spirits and angels were entrusted, and Swedberg claimed the Lord had saved his life more than once, which He did by giving Swedberg direct messages, warning him of dangers.

References

 article Swedberg, Jesper from Nordisk familjebok

External links
 

1653 births
1735 deaths
People from Falun Municipality
Bishops of Skara
Swedish Lutheran hymnwriters
17th-century Swedish people
17th-century Lutheran theologians
18th-century Lutheran theologians